The Lublin Grandmaster Tournament (in full Międzynarodowy Arcymistrzowski Turniej Szachowy im. Unii Lubelskiej meaning International Grandmasters' Tournament the Lublin Union Memorial) is an annual chess tournament, set up primarily as part of the city's bid to become the 2016 European Capital of Culture, which eventually went to Wroclaw instead. The venue is the Crown Tribunal in Lublin.

Lublin Union Memorial 2009 

The 2009 tournament was a ten-player single round robin held between 29 May and 6 June. Boris Grachev won the event, half a point ahead of Roiz and Wojtaszek.

Lublin Union Memorial 2010 

The 2010 edition was held again as a ten-player round robin and took place from 9 to 18 May. The tournament was won on Sonnenborn-Berger tiebreak by Bartłomiej Macieja, ahead of defending champion Grachev and Mateusz Bartel.

Lublin Union Memorial 2011

The format changed slightly for the third edition, held between 15–21 May 2011. While still held as a single round robin, the field was shrunk to eight players from ten in the last edition. Top seed Shirov won, half a point ahead of Grachev and Zhigalko.

Lublin Union Memorial 2012 
For the fourth edition, the format was changed to a double Scheveningen match between Ukraine and Poland, where each member of one team plays twice against all members of the other team, one round being standard time control and the second being rapid games. The Ukraine team won both 15.5-10.5 in the standard time control and 13.5-11.5 in the rapid. A two-game regular blitz match was held between the teams after the rapid section.

Classical time control: Ukraine 15.5 - Poland 10.5

Rapid time control: Ukraine 13.5 - Poland 11.5

Blitz match: Ukraine 5.5 - Poland 4.5

Lublin Union Memorial 2013 
The fifth edition returned to a ten-player round robin format and was held on 15–23 June 2013 at the Crown Tribunal. Draws before 40 moves were banned.

Lublin Union Memorial 2014 
The format was similar to the 2012 format with four players per team with one round classical and one round rapid (no blitz match) on 6–11 May 2014. Again Ukraine and Poland competed, Ukraine dominating the classical round 12.5-3.5 but Poland convincingly won the rapid 10-6.

Classical match: Ukraine 12.5 - Poland 3.5

Rapid match: Ukraine 6 - 10 Poland

Lublin Union Memorial 2015
Similar to the previous edition it was held as a match format with Lublin facing Lviv, Ukraine. A two-round classical match was followed by a seven-round rapid contest between all twelve players and the addition of Polish player Marcin Maka. A round-robin blitz event completed the programme but with Ukrainian Roman Korman substituting Maka.

Lublin convincingly won the Classical match, Marcin Dziuba won the rapid and Pawel Stoma won the blitz.

Classical match

Rapid tournament: 7 rounds

Blitz section

Lublin Union Memorial 2016 
The format was adjusted from previous editions, being held as a six-player Scheveningen match between Poland and a Europe team under classical time control. The Europe team won the six round event 7-5 in match points.

References

Chess competitions
Chess in Poland